Damia is a town located in the Balqa Governorate of Jordan. It has been associated with the biblical City of Adam.

Its population includes a number of families that belong to the Abbad clan such as Ramadneh. The land was accordingly owned mainly by the Abbad tribes with land closer to the river belonging to Al Masaeed tribe whose land extends beyond the Jordan to al-Jiftlik and towards the Jericho areas.

References

External links

Populated places in Balqa Governorate